Brachyxanthia is a genus of moths of the family Noctuidae.

Species
 Brachyxanthia zelotypa (Lederer, 1853)

References
 Brachyxanthia at Markku Savela's Lepidoptera and Some Other Life Forms
 Natural History Museum Lepidoptera genus database

Hadeninae